Microsoft Edge is a proprietary, cross-platform web browser developed by Microsoft. The history began in 2014 when it was started as "Spartan". In 2015, the project was officially known as "Microsoft Edge", and became a default browser of Windows 10. In 2018, Microsoft announced its intent to base Edge on Google's Chromium browser engine. It was released on January 15, 2020.

Edge Legacy

Chromium

References

 
Software version histories